Vrbové ( (modernized: Werbau)) is a town in the Trnava Region of Slovakia. It has a population of about 6,000.

Characteristics 
The town features an originally Gothic church from 1397, an Evangelical Lutheran church from 1928-1929 (on the site of an older Protestant church of 1784), a baroque curia from the 17th century, an oriental-style synagogue from 1883, and a modern St. Gorazd Church.

The Čerenec Dam (0.46 km²), situated to the northwest of the town, is a recreation area.

History 
The present-day town is a very old settlement. The name of the town is derived from a Slavic word for willow. The first written reference to the town stems from 1332. at that time it was part of the Čachtice Castle domain . Vrbové received its town charter in 1437, and was devastated by Turkish troops in 1599. The town was famous for its grain markets, promoted mainly by Jews, who made up a large part of the town's population. In the late 20th century, the town was home to clothing (Trikota works), trading and wood-processing industries.

World War II 

Vrbové is infamous for its past as a Jewish ghetto. During World War II, the entire town of Vrbové was a ghetto for the Jewish population of the Piešťany province of Slovakia. The ghetto was liquidated by the Slovak Nazis known as the Hlinka Guard and the German SS; most of the Jewish people were deported to the death camp at Auschwitz. Most of Vrbove's Jewish population was gassed in Auschwitz's gas chambers.

Demographics 
According to the 2001 census, the town had 6,249 inhabitants. 98.75% of inhabitants were Slovaks and 0.59% Czechs. The religious make-up was 75.48% Roman Catholics, 10.80% people with no religious affiliation and 10.67% Lutherans.

Twin towns — sister cities

Vrbové is twinned with:
 Vítkov, Czech Republic

People 

Rabbis
 Rabbi David Zvi Hoffmann was born there in 1843.
 Vrbové is the birthplace of Rabbi Yosef Chaim Sonnenfeld, the famed Chief Rabbi of Jerusalem.
 The Chief Rabbi of Vrbové, Rabbi Samuel Reich, son of the renowned Rabbi Koppel Reich, survived the Holocaust and emigrated to Jerusalem, where he later died. Before the Second World War he founded a Commerce school which was later nationalized.
 Vrbové's most famous Rabbi was Rabbi Yitschack Weiss, the author of many important works: Siach Yitschack, Elef Ksav, Avnei Beis Hayotser, Hagada Shel Pesach Siach Yitschack, Bina leitim and many more. He was killed in the Holocaust in 1942. His works were sponsored by the Werner family from Vrbové and published by Shem Olam in Bnei Brak.

Vrbové also is the birthplace of:
 Maurice Benyovszky, the discoverer
 Bishop Pavol Jantausch
 Jozef Adamec, Slovak football forward
 Elo Šándor, the Slovak writer

See also 
 Synagogue (Vrbové)
 Vrbovce, Slovakia

References

External links 

 
 Virtual Tour of Vrbové

Cities and towns in Slovakia